One Way Trip is a South Korean film. Directed by Choi Jung-yeol and starring Ji Soo, Kim Jun-myeon, Ryu Jun-yeol, and Kim Hee-chan. It was released on March 24, 2016.

The film was displayed at the 20th Busan International Film Festival which was held from October 1 to October 10, 2015. The release of the film's DVD was on October 27, 2016.

Synopsis 
It's a story of four best friends who go on a trip before one of them leaves for military service; they get involved in an incident that will change their lives forever.

Cast

Main 
Ji Soo as Kim Yong-bi
Kim Jun-myeon as Jeong Sang-woo
Ryu Jun-yeol as Yoon Ji-gong
Kim Hee-chan as Park Doo-man

Others 
Kim Dong-wan as Yong Bi's Older Brother 
Kim Jong-soo as Team Leader Oh 
Choi Joon-yung as Detective Choi 
Lee Joo-sil as Sang-woo's grandmother 
Moon Hee-kyung as Ji-gong's mother 
Yoo Ha-bok as Doo-man's father 
Lee Ji-yeon as Park Eun-Hye
Jung Do-won as Detective Baek
Heo Joon-seok as Violent man
Lee Hyeon as Emergency room doctor
Yang Hee-myung as Delivery man
Ahn Se-ho as Prison officer

Production 

 Filming began on May 1, 2015 and finished on June 7, 2015.

Awards and nominations

References

External links 
 Official Facebook Page

2010s Korean-language films
South Korean coming-of-age films
2015 films
CJ Entertainment films
2010s coming-of-age films
2010s South Korean films